Serious Moonlight is a David Bowie concert video.  Filmed in Vancouver on 12 September 1983, on the singer's "Serious Moonlight Tour", the video was released on VHS and laserdisc in 1984 and on DVD in 2006. The concert includes most of the songs from the concert although "Star", "Stay", "The Jean Genie", "Red Sails" and "Modern Love" were left off the 1984 release due to time constraints; the songs were not reinstated for the 2006 DVD release.

A live version (audio only) of "Modern Love", recorded on 13 July 1983 at a show in Montreal and originally released as the B-side to the studio version of the same song, can be found elsewhere on the 2006 DVD release as background music for the photo gallery.

The audio and exact setlist from the concert film  was reused for the Serious Moonlight (Live '83) live album, included with the Loving the Alien (1983–1988) box set in 2018 and released separately the following year; the live album additionally includes the aforementioned live recording of "Modern Love" as the final track.

Track listing
All songs were written by David Bowie, except where noted.

Film Tracklisting

Album Tracklisting

Charts

Album charts

Video charts

Ricochet (2006 DVD extra)
The 2006 DVD release of Serious Moonlight also contains, as an extra, the 1984 documentary/ concert film Ricochet, chronicling Bowie's experiences in Hong Kong, Singapore, and Bangkok on the Asian leg of the Serious Moonlight tour. Ricochet was previously released to home video in the mid-1980s in a shorter version, separately from the Serious Moonlight video.

References
 Nicholas Pegg, The Complete David Bowie, Page 524, Reynolds & Hearn Ltd, 2004, 

David Bowie video albums
1984 live albums
Live video albums
1984 video albums
David Bowie live albums
Concert films